Luigi Tasso or Alvise Tasso (died 1520) was a Roman Catholic prelate who served as Bishop of Recanati (1516–1520) and Bishop of Poreč (Parenzo) (1500–1516).

Biography
On 24 February 1500, Luigi Tasso was appointed during the papacy of Pope Alexander VI as Bishop of Poreč.
On 16 January 1516, he was appointed during the papacy of Pope Leo X as Bishop of Recanati.
He served as Bishop of Recanati until his death in September 1520.

References

External links and additional sources
 (for Chronology of Bishops) 
 (for Chronology of Bishops) 
 (for Chronology of Bishops) 
 (for Chronology of Bishops) 

16th-century Italian Roman Catholic bishops
Bishops appointed by Pope Alexander VI
Bishops appointed by Pope Leo X
1520 deaths